Halvor Bunkholt (17 June 1903 – 9 May 1978) is a Norwegian politician for the Farmer's Party.

He was born in Saude.

He was elected to the Norwegian Parliament from Telemark in 1950, and was re-elected on one occasion.

Bunkholt was a member of Sauherad municipality council from 1934 to 1971, serving as deputy mayor in 1970–1971. He chaired the countywide party chapter from 1945 to 1947.

Outside politics he graduated from the police academy and spent most of his career as bailiff. Having worked nine years as an assistant banker, he sat on the board for local savings banks.

References

1903 births
1978 deaths
Centre Party (Norway) politicians
Members of the Storting
Politicians from Telemark
20th-century Norwegian politicians